Wetsel is an unincorporated community in Collin County, located in the U.S. state of Texas.

History
Wetsel was located at present-day Hwy 5, Greenville Avenue, and Stacy Road, between Fairview and Allen TX.

References

Unincorporated communities in Collin County, Texas
Unincorporated communities in Texas